Ezequiel Marcelo Castillo Montes (born 13 June 1967 in Buenos Aires) is an Argentine retired footballer who played as a midfielder.

Football career
After starting professionally with Argentinos Juniors, Castillo moved in Spain in January 1989, going on to spend the following 11 years in the country, with RCD Español, CD Tenerife, Rayo Vallecano and CD Badajoz – the latter in the second division – always as an important first-team member. He amassed totals of 224 games and 15 goals in La Liga.

In 2007, seven years after retiring, Castillo returned to active, with lowly Sportivo Patria in his native country (he had already been awarded Spanish citizenship).

External links

Espanyol archives 

1967 births
Living people
Argentine sportspeople of Spanish descent
Argentine emigrants to Spain
Citizens of Spain through descent
Footballers from Buenos Aires
Argentine footballers
Association football midfielders
Argentine Primera División players
Argentinos Juniors footballers
La Liga players
Segunda División players
RCD Espanyol footballers
CD Tenerife players
Rayo Vallecano players
CD Badajoz players
Argentine expatriate footballers
Expatriate footballers in Spain
Argentine expatriate sportspeople in Spain